The Weatherspoon Art Museum is located at the University of North Carolina at Greensboro and is one of the largest collections of modern and contemporary art in the southeast with a focus on American art. Its programming includes fifteen or more exhibitions per year, year-round educational activities, and scholarly publications. The Weatherspoon Art Museum was accredited by the American Alliance of Museums in 1995 and earned reaccreditation status in 2005.

History
Founded in 1941 by Gregory Ivy, first head of the Art Department at Woman’s College (now UNCG), the Woman’s College Art Gallery opened in a former physics lab in the McIver Building, making it the first art gallery within The University of North Carolina system.  The following year, the gallery was officially named in honor of Elizabeth McIver Weatherspoon, an art educator and Woman’s College alumna, and the sister of the college’s late president Charles Duncan McIver. Over the course of seventy years, the Weatherspoon has grown from a teaching gallery to a fully accredited professional museum.

Expansion
In 1985, the Weatherspoon received funding to construct the Anne and Benjamin Cone Building.  Occupying a majority of the 42,000-square-foot building designed by Romaldo Giurgola of Mitchell/Giurgola Architects in Philadelphia and New York, the Weatherspoon features six galleries, a sculpture garden, atrium, auditorium, and two storage vaults, in addition to other features shared with the University of North Carolina at Greensboro Department of Art.

Collections
From its inception, the Weatherspoon has focused on building a permanent collection of modern and contemporary art.  Numbering close to 6,000 artworks, primarily American, the permanent collection represents all major art movements from the beginning of the 20th century to the present. Work by Willem de Kooning, Louise Bourgeois, Knox Martin, Robert Rauschenberg, John Marin, Alexander Calder, Robert Henri, Cindy Sherman, Sol Le Witt, Louise Nevelson, Eva Hesse, and Andy Warhol are included. Other collection highlights include The Dillard Collection of Art on Paper; the Etta and Claribel Cone Collection; the Lenoir C. Wright Collection of Japanese Prints; and The Dorothy and Herbert Vogel Collection: Fifty Works for Fifty States.

Dillard Collection of Art on Paper
Since 1965, the Weatherspoon Art Museum has received corporate funding from the Dillard Paper Company—now xpedx—to present Art on Paper, a biennial exhibition that features regional, national and international artists who have produced significant works made on or of paper. Through the Dillard Fund, the collection of works on paper purchased from those shows numbers close to 
550 objects and includes work by Louise Bourgeois, Brice Marden, Knox Martin, Joan Mitchell, Robert Smithson, Frank Stella, Eva Hesse, and Amy Cutler.

Etta and Claribel Cone Collection
In 1950, 242 works of art were given through a bequest from Etta and Dr. Claribel Cone.  The collection features prints and bronzes by Henri Matisse as well as a large number of modern prints and drawings, including works by Pablo Picasso, Felix Valloton, Raoul Dufy and John Graham.

Lenoir C. Wright Collection of Japanese Prints
Dr. Lenoir C. Wright, a professor emeritus at UNCG before his death in 2003, systematically built a collection of Japanese prints initially as a teaching tool and later gave his collection to the Weatherspoon Art Museum.  The Wright Collection of Japanese woodblock prints numbers over 500 works of art and includes major printmakers such as Hiroshige, Hokusai, and Yoshitoshi. The collection was the focus of a major traveling exhibition, accompanied by a catalogue by Dr. Allen Hockley of Dartmouth College.

The Dorothy and Herbert Vogel Collection: Fifty Works for Fifty States
In 2008 the Weatherspoon Art Museum was selected as the North Carolina museum to receive 50 works on paper from the collection of Dorothy and Herbert Vogel. With the help of the National Gallery of Art, the National Endowment for the Arts, and the Institute of Museum and Library Services, the couple gave 2,500 works from their collection of 4,000+ to public institutions throughout the nation, calling the program The Dorothy and Herbert Vogel Collection: Fifty Works for Fifty States. The Vogels’ donation to the Weatherspoon includes the work of Stephen Antonakos, Robert Barry, Lynda Benglis, Charles Clough, Don Hazlitt, Ralph Iwamoto, Bill Jensen, Alain Kirili, Michael Lucero, Lucio Pozzi, Edda Renouf, Judy Rifka, Lori Taschler and Richard Tuttle.

Sculpture garden
The Weatherspoon's sculpture garden features 7,000 square feet of natural plantings, flowers and shrubs, and showcases work by modern and contemporary artists including Elie Nadelman, George Rickey, Dan Graham, Deborah Butterfield, and Antony Gormley.

Falk Visiting Artist Program
The Falk Visiting Artist program, named after and supported by an endowment from benefactors Herbert and Louise Falk, was launched in 1982. A collaboration between the Weatherspoon and the UNCG Art Department, the program brings nationally and internationally renowned artists to campus. In both the Fall and Spring semesters, the Weatherspoon organizes an exhibition of the visiting artist’s work and, during a several-day residency, s/he makes studio visits with MFA graduate students and presents a public lecture to the Greensboro and campus communities.

References

External links
 Weatherspoon Art Museum official website

University of North Carolina at Greensboro
Art museums and galleries in North Carolina
Museums in Greensboro, North Carolina
University museums in North Carolina
Modern art museums in the United States
Art museums established in 1941
1941 establishments in North Carolina